Young's Motorsports is an American professional stock car racing team that competes in the NASCAR Craftsman Truck Series and the ARCA Menards Series. In the Truck Series, they field three full-time Chevrolet Silverados: the No. 02 for Kris Wright, the No. 12 for Spencer Boyd, and the No. 20 for multiple drivers. In the ARCA Menards Series, they field the No. 02 Chevrolet SS part-time for Miguel Gomes and Leland Honeyman.

History

Craftsman Truck Series

Truck No. 02 history

The team debuted in the 2012 NASCAR Camping World Truck Series season with Tyler Young in a part-time schedule. In 2013, Young returned for a part-time schedule. In 2014 the team ran its first full-time season, again with Young. In 2016, the team returned to a part-time schedule, sharing the No. 02 with Austin Hill Racing and Rette Jones Racing. Dylan Lupton, Austin Theriault, Derek Scott Jr. and Scott Lagasse Jr. also drove the 02 in 2016.
In 2017, the team announced that the truck would be split by Austin Hill and Tyler Young. Australian sprint car racing driver Max Johnston drove the truck at Eldora Speedway.

In 2018, Austin Hill drove the 02 full-time. Despite scoring a top-five at Texas, six top-tens and an eleventh-place finish in points, Hill said that rules changes and simple mistakes by the team held them back from greater success.

In 2019, Tyler Dippel joined Young's Motorsports to drive the No. 02 full-time. On August 23, NASCAR announced that Dippel had been suspended indefinitely for violation of the sport's Code of Conduct. Young's Motorsports has not yet announced his substitute replacement for the race at Canada nor the following races until his suspension is lifted. D. J. Kennington served as his substitute replacement for the race at Canada. Dippel was reinstated the following week on August 28, 2019.

In 2020, the team announced that Tate Fogleman will compete for Rookie of The Year honors driving the 02 truck. He ended the season with a 17th-place points finish with a best finish of 13th at Michigan.

In 2021, the team announced that they would be adding Rookie of The Year honor contestant Kris Wright to their No. 02 truck, and they would be moving Fogleman to their No. 12 truck. Wright started the season with a twelfth-place finish at Daytona. At the Daytona Road Course, the team unexpectedly announced that Kaz Grala would replace Wright while he made his Xfinity Series debut, Grala would come in eighth. After Wright had a positive test for COVID-19 just before the race at Atlanta, Josh Berry replaced him, finishing 22nd. Daniel Suarez also replaced Wright at Bristol, finishing 17th. At Darlington, Wright ran a throwback scheme to Dale Earnhardt, however, instead of his longtime sponsor Goodwrench, the sponsor was wrightcars.com, with larger letters on the side saying Goodwright. Grala returned at Circuit of the Americas, being in the top 3 most of the day and finishing 2nd to Todd Gilliland, whom he battled with for the stage 1 win, which Gilliland won. Michael Annett wanted to make his debut at the Corn Belt 150, but a leg injury caused him to be replaced by Chris Windom. On October 6, NASCAR indefinitely suspended crew chief Eddie Troconis for violation of Sections 12.8.1.c Behavioral.

Truck No. 02 results

Truck No. 12 history

In 2018, the team debuted at Iowa Speedway with Reid Wilson behind the wheel. Ty Dillon drove at Eldora Speedway. Alex Tagliani was announced to drive at Mosport.

In 2019, Gus Dean joined Young's Motorsports to drive the No. 12 full-time. During the February Daytona  race, he spun on the last laps hitting Ben Rhodes’ No. 99 and then started the Big One, finishing fifteenth. His best finish was thirteenth at Michigan and his worst was thirty-second at Martinsville and Texas. He ended up finishing fifteenth in the points at the end of the 2019 season.

In 2020, T. J. Bell was to drive the Young's Motorsports No. 12 at the spring Atlanta race, but the truck was not entered when the race was postponed from March to June due to the COVID-19 pandemic. Bell would instead drive the No. 83 CMI Motorsports truck in the rescheduled race.

For 2021, Tate Fogleman would move over from the 02 to the 12 truck for his sophomore season to make room for rookie Kris Wright. He would start the season with a crash-ending 30th-place finish at Daytona. On October 2, Fogleman scored his first career win at Talladega by sending John Hunter Nemechek sideways and beating Tyler Hill by 0.052 seconds before both trucks crashed into the inner wall. 

On January 7, 2022 it was announced that Spencer Boyd would drive the No. 12 full-time in 2022; he had driven the team's No. 20 truck since 2019. At Las Vegas, he suffered a dislocated shoulder in a last lap crash.

Truck No. 12 results

Truck No. 20 history

The No. 20 was Austin Hill Racing's former number. In 2017, with Hill now on No. 02 truck, the second truck became the No. 20. The team debuted at Iowa Speedway. Speed Energy Formula Off-Road champion Sheldon Creed drove the No. 20 at Eldora Speedway.

The team planned to run full-time with the No. 20 team in 2018. Scott Lagasse Jr. drove the No. 20 Chevrolet in the season opener at Daytona with a 5th-place finish. Austin and Ty Dillon soon after announced through Team Dillon that Richard Childress Racing affiliated drivers, including Austin, Ty, Daniel Hemric and Tanner Thorson would pilot the 20 for the vast majority of the remaining schedule, with Thorson taking most of the races. Michel Disdier, Reid Wilson, Tate Fogleman, Darrell Wallace Jr. and Max Tullman also drove the 20 truck in 2018.

For the 2019 season, Spencer Boyd was announced to pilot the 20 full-time. He started off the season with a career-best fourth-place result at the 2019 NextEra Energy 250. Boyd raced the team to an unofficial second-place finish in the 2019 Sugarlands Shine 250 at Talladega, however the unofficial winner, Johnny Sauter, would be penalized for forcing the No. 51 KBM truck of Riley Herbst below the double yellow line in an attempt to block, giving the win to Boyd and Young's Motorsports. Boyd would return to the 20 truck in 2020 and would take it to a best finish of 14th at Texas and a 20th-place points finish. He would return to the 20 truck for a third season in 2021 and would take the truck to a 13th-place finish behind teammate Kris Wright at Daytona. In the Corn Belt 150, Kyle Strickler replaced Boyd. Sheldon Creed made his pole position at Circuit of the Americas in 2022. He then start and parked after 1 lap due to his transmission issues after replacing the fuel pump during the pace laps.

Truck No. 20 results

Truck No. 42 history
In 2014, the team fielded a second truck (No. 60) for Charles Lewandoski at Daytona but the team withdrew. The team returned at Kansas as a start and park team to help fund the team's No. 02 car but now with a new number (No. 42). After 6 races, the No. 42 team shut down.

Truck No. 42 results

Partnerships
In 2013, Tyler Young drove No. 6 for the team at Rockingham Speedway, using Sharp Gallaher Racing owners' points. He finished 24th in the race.

In 2016, Young's teamed with Austin Hill Racing fielding No. 02 Ford for Hill's self-owned team in four races. Later that year Young's partnered with Rette Jones Racing to field the No. 02 for Dominique Van Wieringen at Phoenix International Raceway. The next race, at Homestead, Young's fielded the No. 07 truck for Patrick Staropoli that utilized owner points from SS-Green Light Racing.

In 2017, Austin Hill started to run for the team in No. 02, sharing the truck with Tyler Young. However, Hill drove Ford trucks that he owned while Young ran Chevrolets from the team inventory.

ARCA Menards Series

Car No. 02 history
On January 14, 2021, the team announced that they would expand into the ARCA Menards Series, fielding the No. 02 car on a part-time basis. The team first entered the series in ARCA's Daytona test session in January with Kris Wright (one of their full-time Truck Series drivers) and Toni Breidinger driving. Their first race will come in the season-opening race at Daytona in February, although they have yet to determine the rest of their schedule and who their driver(s) will be in each race. Toni Breidinger made some appearances for the team. Mark Green would appear at Mid-Ohio. Breidinger would depart the team and join her old team Venturini Motorsports. Connor Mosack made 3 starts for the rest of the year.

In 2022, Leland Honeyman drove the No. 02 car for 3 races. Kris Wright drove the car for 1 race at Pocono. Dylan "Mamba" Smith made his ARCA debut in the No. 02 car at IRP.

In 2023, Miguel Gomes drove the No. 02 car at Daytona. Honeyman drove the car at Phoenix.

ARCA Menards Series East

Car No. 02 history
In 2021, the team fielded the No. 02 car part-time in the ARCA Menards Series East for Connor Mosack at Dover. He finished 7th. He would make one more start at the Milwaukee Mile. He finished 16th.

In 2022, the No. 02 car would run full-time with Leland Honeyman as the driver.

ARCA Menards Series West

Car No. 02 history
In 2021, the team fielded the No. 02 car part-time for Toni Breidinger at Phoenix.

In 2022, the team fielded the No. 02 car part-time for Katie Hettinger at Las Vegas Bullring and Phoenix.

In 2023, the team fielded the No. 02 car part-time for Leland Honeyman at Phoenix.

References

External links
 

American auto racing teams
NASCAR teams
ARCA Menards Series teams